Aerotec may refer to:

 Aerotec S/A Indústria Aeronáutica, former Brazilian aircraft manufacturer
 Aerotec S.A., former name of Colombian aircraft manufacturer AeroAndina
 Premium AEROTEC, German company, manufacturing subsidiary of Airbus